Woodrow may refer to:

People
Woodrow (name), a given name and a surname

Places

Canada
Woodrow, Saskatchewan, an unincorporated community

United Kingdom
Woodrow, Buckinghamshire, England
Woodrow, Cumbria, England

United States
Woodrow, Colorado, an unincorporated town
Woodrow, Minnesota, an unincorporated community
Woodrow, Staten Island, New York, a neighborhood in New York City
Woodrow, Utah, an unincorporated community
Woodrow, Hampshire and Morgan Counties, West Virginia, an unincorporated community
Woodrow, Pocahontas County, West Virginia, an unincorporated community
Woodrow Township, Beltrami County, Minnesota, a township
Woodrow Township, Cass County, Minnesota, a township
Woodrow, Texas, an unincorporated community

Other
Woodrow (automobile), a British cyclecar
Woodrow (television), a dog on the Australian television show Simon Townsend's Wonder World